Paul Campbell may refer to:

Actors
 Paul Campbell (American actor) (1923–1999), American film actor
 Paul Campbell (Canadian actor) (born 1979), Canadian actor
 Paul Campbell (Jamaican actor), Jamaican film and theatre actor

Sportspeople
 Paul Campbell (American football) (1926–2005)
 Paul Campbell (cricketer) (born 1968), New Zealand cricketer
 Paul Campbell (first baseman) (1917–2006), American baseball player, manager and executive
 Paul Campbell (footballer) (born 1980)
 Paul Campbell (pitcher) (born 1995), American baseball player

Others
 Paul G. Campbell Jr. (born 1946), American politician
 Paul Campbell (entrepreneur) (born 1959), British entrepreneur and musician